Yuzhnoye Izmaylovo  (Southern Izmaylovo) is an area ( former Moscow neighborhood now part of Ivanovskoe just north of Shosse Entuziastov route)  located in the eastern part of Moscow, Russia, just north of the Shosse Entuziastov (шоссе Энтузиастов) Route and west of the Moscow Ring Highway (МКАД). It borders Izmaylovo District in the south and Izmaylovsky Park in the north and west. In 1960, it became a part of Moscow, after all territories inside Moscow Ring Highway  were annexed by Moscow City proper.

Yuzhnoye Izmaylovo is in one of the green areas of Moscow. Izmaylovsky Park, one of the biggest forested areas in urban places in Europe, is right across the street. The place was built up in the mid-1970s as an Olympic village for the Moscow Olympics of 1980 but was eventually converted into a bedroom community, a microdistrict for the fast-growing population of the city. Yuzhnoye Izmaylovo is less than an hour away from the center of the city by public transportation (bus and Moscow metro).

Streets
Source:
Bolshoy Kupavensky Drive — Большой Купавенский проезд
Maly Kupavensky Drive — Малый Купавенский проезд
Chelyabinskaya Street — Челябинская улица
Chechulina Street — Улица Чечулина (former Srednii (Middle) Kupavensky Drive)
Magnitogorskaya Street — Магнитогорская улица

References

Geography of Moscow